Klucze may refer to the following places in Poland:
Klucze, Lower Silesian Voivodeship (south-west Poland)
Klucze, Lesser Poland Voivodeship (south Poland)